St. Louis-style pizza is a type of pizza popular in St. Louis, Missouri, and surrounding areas. The style has a thin cracker-like crust made without yeast, generally uses Provel cheese, and is cut into squares or rectangles instead of wedges.

St. Louis-style pizza may be ordered at many local restaurants, including local chains such as Imo's Pizza and Cecil Whittaker's. Frozen versions are sold at local supermarkets such as Schnucks and Dierbergs Markets.

Characteristics and preparation

Crust
The crust is made without yeast, as opposed to a deep-dish Chicago-style pizza or the thin but leavened New York-style pizza, yielding a somewhat crisp and cracker-like crust that cannot be easily folded.

Instead of the larger pie-like wedges typical of many pizza styles, St. Louis pizza is typically cut into three- or four-inch squares, a style referred to as party or tavern cut. Correspondingly, some local restaurants make their pizzas rectangular rather than round. The reason remains unknown.

Some say Ed Imo—founder of a prominent chain of St. Louis pizzerias—was a tile layer and cut his pizza accordingly; others say it is a practical measure that seeks to keep the thin crust from cracking under the weight of the toppings.

Cheese
St. Louis-style pizza often includes a white processed cheese known as Provel.  Provel is a trademark for a combination of three cheeses (provolone, Swiss, and white cheddar) used instead of (or, rarely, in addition to) the mozzarella or provolone common to other styles of pizza. Provel cheese was developed by the St. Louis firm Costa Grocery in the 1950s and is made in Wisconsin primarily for the St. Louis market. The cheese is not widely available outside the St. Louis area.

Sauce
The sauce is often seasoned with more oregano than other pizza types. Despite its thin crust, St. Louis-style pizza can be layered deeply with many different toppings because of the sturdiness of the cracker-like crust. Some of the sauces have a sweetness to them, which is likely due to the influence of Sicilian immigrants upon Italian foods in St. Louis.

See also

 Imo's Pizza
 St. Louis cuisine
 Cuisine of the Midwestern United States
 Culture of St. Louis
 Pizza cheese
 St. Louis-style barbecue

References

Cuisine of St. Louis
Pizza in the United States
Cuisine of the Midwestern United States
Pizza styles